Nigel Hitchcock (born 4 January 1971) is an English jazz saxophonist.

Biography
Hitchcock began to play alto sax at the age of eight. In 1982 he and his elder brother Clive joined the National Youth Jazz Orchestra. After one year Nigel took the lead alto chair for the next five years. During this time the orchestra toured with different musicians such as Vic Damone, Buddy Greco and Al Martino.

At the age of 16, Hitchcock moved to London and began his career as a session musician and also had recorded TV jingles, movie soundtracks, and pop solos.

In 1989 he joined the contemporary saxophone quartet Itchy Fingers. The band toured Europe and South-East Asia for 18 months. With Itchy Fingers Hitchcock received three jazz awards: the Schlitz award for rising star, the Cleo Laine Personal Award for best young musician, and the Pat Smythe (pianist) Trust award. He left the band to continue as a pop and session musician.

Nigel has performed with many artists including Tom Jones, Wet Wet Wet, Beverley Craven, Ray Charles, Robbie Williams, and Mark Knopfler and has released 3 solo albums, the first 'Snakeranch Sessions' in 1997 under Black Box and the next two,'SmootHitch'(2013) and 'Hitchgnosis'(2019)released under his own Eight Inch Clock label.

Discography

Pop
Robbie Williams/ Christmas Party – Columbia 2019
Q4/ Uphill Struggle – Hey!jazz HJZ-18070 2019
Nigel Hitchcock/ Hitchgnosis – Eight Inch Clock 2019
MaxSax/ Shift – Jazzhaus 2019
Incognito/ Tomorrow's New Dream – Bluey Music 2019
Saxofourte/ Rubini Is Coming – 36 Music 2019
Mark Knopfler/ Down The Road Wherever – British Grove Records 2018
Kate Bush/ Remastered Part 1 – Parlophone 2018
Aretha Franklin with RPO/ A Brand New Me – Rhino Records,Atlantic 2017
Elvis with RPO/ The Wonder of You – Sony Music/RCA/Legacy 2016
MaxSax/ The Long Ride – Painted Dog Records 2016
Tristan/ Full Power – Isolde Records – 888174601410 2015
Gavin Harrison/ Cheating the Polygraph – KSCOPE 2014
Mark Knopfler/ Tracker – British Grove Records 2015
Incognito/ Amplified Soul – Ear Music – 0209437ERE 2014
Marilia Andrés / Subir una montaña- 2013
Nigel Hitchcock/ SmootHitch (Eight Inch Clock)2012 
Mark Knopfler/ Privateering/Universal 2012
Karl Jenkins/ The Peacemakers/EMI 2012
Mario Biondi/ Due/Handful of Music 2012
The Deep MO/ Funk in the 3rd Quarter/Groove4Dayz 2012
Usonic/ Diversion/Groove4Dayz 2012
Ryujin Kiyoshi/ People/EMI Music Japan 2001 
Usonic/ EvolutionGroove4Dayz 2011
Peatbog Faeries/ Dust/Peatbog Records 2011
Sebastiaan Cornellison/ On Impulse/On Impulse 2011
Old Blind Dogs/ Wherever Yet May Be 2010
Marti Pellow/ Boulevard of Life 2010
Claire Martin/ A Modern Art/LINN AKD 340 2009
Mark Nightingale/ Out of the Box/Woodville Records 2009
Peatbog Faeries/ Live/Peatbog Records 2009
The Deep MO/ The Deep MO/Groove4Dayz 2009
12 Stone Toddler/ Does It Scare You/Amazon 2007
Claire Martin/ He Never Mentioned Love/Linn Records AKD 295 2007
Peatbog Faeries/ What Men Deserve To Lose/Peatbog Records 2007
Tony Christie/ Way To Amarillo/Tug Records 2006
Lisa Stansfield/ The Moment/Edelr 2005
Peatbog Faeries/ Croftwork/Peatbog Records 2005
Ian Shaw/ Drawn To All Things/Linn AKD276 2005
Chris Botti/ When I Fall in Love/Columbia Records 2004
Karl Jenkins/ Adiemus V,Vocalise/EMI 557 6492 2004
Colin Towns/ Nowhere And Heaven/Provocateur Records 2004
Dani Siciliano/ Likes/!K7 2004
Shirley Bassey/ Thank You for the Years/Sony 2004
Claire Martin/ Secret Love/Linn Records AKD 391 2004
Snowdogs/ Deep Cuts,Fast Remedies/Victory Records 2002
Claire Martin/ Too Darn Hot!/Linn Records AKH 272 2002
Gota Yashiki/ Day and Night/Instinct Records 2001
Sheena Easton/ Fabulous/Universal 2001
Clark Tracey/ Stability/Linn Records AKD159 2001
Swing Out Sister/ Somewhere Deep in the Night – Universal UICE-1010/ 2001
Jamiroquai/ A Funk Odyssey – Sony 5040692 2001
Joe Cocker / No Ordinary World – EMI – 1999
Gary Barlow / 12 Months 11 Days – BMG – 1999
Richard Ashcroft / "Money To Burn"/BMG – 1999
Boyzone / Shooting Star – Polydor 5691672 1998
Kym Mazelle / Young Hearts Run Free – EMI CDEM 488 – 1998
Lutricia McNeal / "Someone Loves You Honey" – Wildstar CDWild9 – 1998
Spice Girls / Lady is a Vamp – 1998
Spice Girls+Echo & the Bunnymen / England Forever – London LONCD 414 – 1998
Robbie Williams / "Let Me Entertain You" – Chrysalis CDCHS 5080 – 1998
Brand New Heavies / Close to You – 1997
Shane Richie / The Album – Polygram TV 539 495-2 – 1997
Shakatak / Let The Piano Play – CD INZ 5 – 1997
Ray Charles / Strong Love Affair – Qwest 9362-46107-2 – 1996
Hue & Cry / Jazz not jazz – Linn akd057 – 1996
Kavana / Crazy Chance – Virgin 7243 89351828 – 1996
Adiemus / Songs of the sanctuary – Virgin vjcp-25180 – 1995
Alejandro Sanz / 3 – wea 0630 10122-2 – 1995
Boo Radleys / "Wake Up Boo!" – Creation CRECD179 – 1995
Cher / It's a mans world – wea 0630-12670-2 – 1995
Linda Lewis / For Love Sake – Turpin tpn-1CD – 1995
Take That / Nobody Else – RCA 74321 279092 – 1995
Teenage Fanclub / Grand Prix – Creation CRECD173 – 1995
Carleen Anderson / Nervous Breakdown – Circa 7243 8 9229127 – 1994
Tom Jones / The lead and how to swing it – Interscope 6544926492 – 1994
Rick Astley / Body & Soul – BMG 74321156332 – 1993
Kate Bush / The Red Shoes – EMI 7243 8 27277 2 9 – 1993
Right Said Fred / Sex and Travel – Tug SnogCD2 – 1993
Kenny Thomas / Wait for me – Cooltempo 7243 8 27209 2 8 – 1993
The Wonder Stuff / Construction for the Modern Idiot – Polydor 519894-2 – 1993
The Beloved / Conscience – East-West 4509-91483-2 – 1992
Magic Garden / Another Way – Blue Triangle 01 – 1992
Jimmy Nail / Growing Up in Public – East-West 4509-90144-2 – 1992
Swing Out Sister / Get in Touch with Yourself – Fontana 512241-2 – 1992
Father Father / We are all so very happy – Go Discs 828 258-2 – 1991
Moody Blues / Keys of the Kingdom – Polydor 849-443-2 – 1991
The Pasadenas / Love Thing – CBS CD PASA 4 – 1990
The Pasadenas/Elevate / Columbia – 467023.2 – 1990
Sugarcubes / Here Today, Tomorrow Next Week! – One Little Indian tplp15CD – 1989

Jazz
Clark Tracey/ Stability – Linn Records AKD159 – 2001
Colin Towns Mask Orchestra / Another Think Coming – Provocateur PVC1028
Richard Niles / Club Deranged – Nucool NC0001 – 1999
Franc O'Shea / Esprit – Alltone ALFO 003 – 1999
Kate Dimbleby / Good Vibrations – Black Box BBJ1004 – 1998
Don Weller Big Band / Live – 33 Records 33jazz032 – 1997
Colin Towns Mask Orchestra / Nowhere & Heaven – Provocateur PVC 1013 – 1996
Laurence Cottle / Live! – Jazzizit JITCD9504 – 1995
Paul Spong / Holdin' On Big – Bat BBM 9501 – 1995
Clark Tracey / Full Speed Sideways – 33 Records 33Jazz018 – 1994
Guy Barker's Extravaganza / Isn't It? – Spotlite SPJ-CD 545 – 1993
Laurence Cottle / Five Seasons – WAD CD 001 – 1992
Claire Martin / Devil May Care – Linn AKD021 – 1993
Masque (Niki Falzon) / Twilight Moods – MASQUE 9361 – 1992
Itchy Fingers / Live – enja 6076 2 – 1991
Sax Appeal / Flat out – HEP CD 2050 – 1991
Tony Crombie & Friends / Renaissance – CDREN 001 – 1989

Other
Barbara Windsor / You've Got A Friend – Telstar TVCD3034 – 1999
Chris Young / The Man Who Knew Too Little (soundtrack) – Varèse Sarabande 5886 – 1997
Sax Moods / Capture the spirit – Dino DINCD106 – 1995
Michael Ball / One Careful Owner – Columbia 477280 2 – 1994
Mark Isham / Cool World (movie soundtrack) – Varèse Sarabande VSD-5382 – 1992
London Symphony Orchestra / Classic Rock-Wind of Change – Columbia MoodCD19 – 1991

References

External links
Official website

1971 births
Living people
English jazz saxophonists
British male saxophonists
People from Rustington
English session musicians
21st-century saxophonists
21st-century British male musicians
British male jazz musicians
National Youth Jazz Orchestra members